Folsom is a borough in Atlantic County, New Jersey, United States. As of the 2020 United States census, the borough's population was 1,811, a decrease of 74 (−3.9%) from the 2010 census count of 1,885, which in turn reflected a decline of 87 (−4.4%) from the 1,972 counted in the 2000 census.

Folsom was incorporated as a borough by an act of the New Jersey Legislature on May 23, 1906, from portions of Buena Vista Township. The borough was named for Frances Folsom, wife of President Grover Cleveland.

New Jersey Monthly magazine ranked Folsom as its 19th best place to live in its 2008 rankings of the "Best Places To Live" in New Jersey.

Geography

According to the United States Census Bureau, the borough had a total area of 8.51 square miles (22.04 km2), including 8.26 square miles (21.40 km2) of land and 0.25 square miles (0.63 km2) of water (2.88%).

Unincorporated communities, localities and place names located partially or completely within the borough include Penny Pot.

Folsom borders the municipalities of Buena Vista Township, Hamilton Township, and Hammonton in Atlantic County; Winslow Township in Camden County; and Monroe Township in Gloucester County.

The borough is one of 56 South Jersey municipalities that are included within the New Jersey Pinelands National Reserve, a protected natural area of unique ecology covering , that has been classified as a United States Biosphere Reserve and established by Congress in 1978 as the nation's first National Reserve. All of the borough is included in the state-designated Pinelands Area, which includes portions of Atlantic County, along with areas in Burlington, Camden, Cape May, Cumberland, Gloucester and Ocean counties.

Demographics

2010 census

The Census Bureau's 2006–2010 American Community Survey showed that (in 2010 inflation-adjusted dollars) median household income was $65,795 (with a margin of error of +/− $5,755) and the median family income was $67,778 (+/− $7,595). Males had a median income of $50,192 (+/− $6,784) versus $36,471 (+/− $4,204) for females. The per capita income for the borough was $29,446 (+/− $2,979). About 3.2% of families and 5.6% of the population were below the poverty line, including 6.9% of those under age 18 and 8.9% of those age 65 or over.

2000 census
As of the 2000 United States census there were 1,972 people, 671 households, and 552 families residing in the borough. The racial makeup of the borough was 91.73% White, 4.41% African American, 0.15% Native American, 0.86% Asian, 0.15% Pacific Islander, 1.57% from other races, and 1.12% from two or more races. 3.45% of the population were Hispanic or Latino of any race.

There were 671 households, out of which 37.1% had children under the age of 18 living with them, 64.4% were married couples living together, 14.2% had a female householder with no husband present, and 17.7% were non-families. 13.7% of all households were made up of individuals, and 3.9% had someone living alone who was 65 years of age or older. The average household size was 2.93 and the average family size was 3.18.

In the borough the population was spread out, with 24.9% under the age of 18, 8.8% from 18 to 24, 30.0% from 25 to 44, 26.5% from 45 to 64, and 9.8% who were 65 years of age or older. The median age was 38 years. For every 100 females, there were 96.2 males. For every 100 females age 18 and over, there were 92.6 males.

The median income for a household in the borough was $56,406, and the median income for a family was $59,231. Males had a median income of $39,659 versus $30,000 for females. The per capita income for the borough was $20,617. 5.7% of the population and 4.2% of families were below the poverty line. Out of the total population, 4.3% of those under the age of 18 and 4.9% of those 65 and older were living below the poverty line.

Government

Local government
Folsom is governed under the Borough form of New Jersey municipal government, which is used in 218 municipalities (of the 564) statewide, making it the most common form of government in New Jersey. The governing body is comprised of the Mayor and the Borough Council, with all positions elected at-large on a partisan basis as part of the November general election. The Mayor is elected directly by the voters to a four-year term of office. The Borough Council is comprised of six members elected to serve three-year terms on a staggered basis, with two seats coming up for election each year in a three-year cycle. The Borough form of government used by Folsom is a "weak mayor / strong council" government in which council members act as the legislative body with the mayor presiding at meetings and voting only in the event of a tie. The mayor can veto ordinances subject to an override by a two-thirds majority vote of the council. The mayor makes committee and liaison assignments for council members, and most appointments are made by the mayor with the advice and consent of the council.

, the Mayor of Folsom is Republican Greg Schenker, whose term of office ends December 31, 2023. Members of the Borough Council are Council President Gregory Conway (R, 2024), Jacob Blazer (R, 2023), James Hoffman (R, 2022), Albert W. Norman Jr. (R, 2024), Mike Porretta (R, 2022) and James C. Whittaker Jr. (R, 2023).

In January 2020, the Borough Council appointed Jake Blazer to fill the balance of the term expiring in December 2021 that had been held by Greg Schenker until he resigned from office.

In September 2016, the Borough Council selected Lisa O'Toole from a list of three candidates nominated by the Republican municipal committee to fill the seat expiring in December 2018 that had been vacated by Bryan Gummoe, who resigned the previous month. In the November 2016 general election, Independent Greg Schenker defeated O'Toole to win the balance of the term of office.

The Borough Council selected Louis DeStefano in August 2014 from among three names offered by the Republican municipal committee to fill the vacant seat of Mayor Thomas N. Ballistreri, who had resigned earlier that month. In September 2014, Bennett Pagano was selected by the Borough Council from among the three candidates recommended by the local Republican Committee to fill Louis DeStefano's vacant council seat. Pagano was elected in November 2014 to serve the balance of the term.

Federal, state and county representation
Folsom is located in the 2nd Congressional District and is part of New Jersey's 2nd state legislative district. Prior to the 2011 reapportionment following the 2010 Census, Folsom had been in the 9th state legislative district.

 

Atlantic County is governed by a directly elected county executive and a nine-member Board of County Commissioners, responsible for legislation. The executive serves a four-year term and the commissioners are elected to staggered three-year terms, of which four are elected from the county on an at-large basis and five of the commissioners represent equally populated districts. , Atlantic County's Executive is Republican Dennis Levinson, whose term of office ends December 31, 2023. Members of the Board of County Commissioners are:

Ernest D. Coursey, District 1, including Atlantic City (part), Egg Harbor Township (part), and Pleasantville (D, 2022, Atlantic City), Chair Maureen Kern, District 2, including Atlantic City (part), Egg Harbor Township (part), Linwood, Longport, Margate City, Northfield, Somers Point and Ventnor City (R, 2024, Somers Point), Andrew Parker III, District 3, including Egg Harbor Township (part) and Hamilton Township (part) (R, Egg Harbor Township, 2023), Richard R. Dase, District 4, including Absecon, Brigantine, Galloway Township and Port Republic (R, 2022, Galloway Township), James A. Bertino, District 5, including Buena, Buena Vista Township, Corbin City, Egg Harbor City, Estell Manor, Folsom, Hamilton Township (part), Hammonton, Mullica Township and Weymouth Township (R, 2018, Hammonton), Caren L. Fitzpatrick, At-Large (D, 2023, Linwood), Frank X. Balles, At-Large (R, Pleasantville, 2024) Amy L. Gatto, Freeholder (R, 2022, Hamilton Township) and Vice Chair John W. Risley, At-Large (R, 2023, Egg Harbor Township) 

Atlantic County's constitutional officers are: 
County Clerk Joesph J. Giralo (R, 2026, Hammonton),  
Sheriff Eric Scheffler (D, 2024, Northfield) and 
Surrogate James Curcio (R, 2025, Hammonton).

Politics
As of March 2011, there were a total of 1,229 registered voters in Folsom, of which 252 (20.5% vs. 30.5% countywide) were registered as Democrats, 355 (28.9% vs. 25.2%) were registered as Republicans and 622 (50.6% vs. 44.3%) were registered as Unaffiliated. There were no voters registered to other parties. Among the borough's 2010 Census population, 65.2% (vs. 58.8% in Atlantic County) were registered to vote, including 83.7% of those ages 18 and over (vs. 76.6% countywide).

In the 2012 presidential election, Republican Mitt Romney received 442 votes (49.9% vs. 41.1% countywide), ahead of Democrat Barack Obama with 427 votes (48.2% vs. 57.9%) and other candidates with 10 votes (1.1% vs. 0.9%), among the 886 ballots cast by the borough's 1,257 registered voters, for a turnout of 70.5% (vs. 65.8% in Atlantic County). In the 2008 presidential election, Republican John McCain received 457 votes (50.2% vs. 41.6% countywide), ahead of Democrat Barack Obama with 441 votes (48.4% vs. 56.5%) and other candidates with 5 votes (0.5% vs. 1.1%), among the 911 ballots cast by the borough's 1,282 registered voters, for a turnout of 71.1% (vs. 68.1% in Atlantic County). In the 2004 presidential election, Republican George W. Bush received 482 votes (52.2% vs. 46.2% countywide), ahead of Democrat John Kerry with 425 votes (46.0% vs. 52.0%) and other candidates with 6 votes (0.7% vs. 0.8%), among the 923 ballots cast by the borough's 1,267 registered voters, for a turnout of 72.8% (vs. 69.8% in the whole county).

In the 2013 gubernatorial election, Republican Chris Christie received 392 votes (68.1% vs. 60.0% countywide), ahead of Democrat Barbara Buono with 168 votes (29.2% vs. 34.9%) and other candidates with 6 votes (1.0% vs. 1.3%), among the 576 ballots cast by the borough's 1,265 registered voters, yielding a 45.5% turnout (vs. 41.5% in the county). In the 2009 gubernatorial election, Republican Chris Christie received 329 votes (57.7% vs. 47.7% countywide), ahead of Democrat Jon Corzine with 198 votes (34.7% vs. 44.5%), Independent Chris Daggett with 27 votes (4.7% vs. 4.8%) and other candidates with 6 votes (1.1% vs. 1.2%), among the 570 ballots cast by the borough's 1,246 registered voters, yielding a 45.7% turnout (vs. 44.9% in the county).

Education
The Folsom Borough School District serves public school students in pre-kindergarten through eighth grade at Folsom School. As of the 2018–19 school year, the district, comprised of one school, had an enrollment of 410 students and 39.0 classroom teachers (on an FTE basis), for a student–teacher ratio of 10.5:1.

For ninth through twelfth grades, public school students attend Hammonton High School, in Hammonton as part of a sending/receiving relationship with the Hammonton Public Schools, alongside students from Waterford Township, who attend for grades 7–12 as part of an agreement with the Waterford Township School District. As of the 2018–19 school year, the high school had an enrollment of 1,393 students and 97.4 classroom teachers (on an FTE basis), for a student–teacher ratio of 14.3:1.

City public school students are also eligible to attend the Atlantic County Institute of Technology in the Mays Landing section of Hamilton Township or the Charter-Tech High School for the Performing Arts, located in Somers Point.

Transportation

Roads and highways

Three significant highways directly serve Folsom. U.S. Route 322 follows the Black Horse Pike across the borough from northwest to southeast, connecting Folsom to Monroe Township and Hamilton Township. New Jersey Route 54 is oriented northeast to southwest across the borough, linking Folsom with Hammonton and Buena Vista Township. New Jersey Route 73 heads north from U.S. Route 322, briefly clipping Hammonton before entering Winslow Township.

Public transportation
NJ Transit provides bus service on the 315 route that runs between Cape May and Philadelphia.

Notable people

People who were born in, residents of, or otherwise closely associated with Folsom include:

 Jimmy Horton (born 1956), race car driver
 Kenneth LeFevre (born 1945), member of the New Jersey General Assembly from 1996 to 2002
 E. B. Lewis (born 1956), illustrator who won the 2006 Charlotte Zolotow Award for his illustrations of My Best Friend by Mary Ann Rodman
 G. R. Smith (born 1981), professional stock car racing driver who has raced in the NASCAR Camping World Truck Series and the ARCA Racing Series

References

External links

 Borough website
 Folsom School website
 
 School Data for the Folsom School, National Center for Education Statistics
 Hammonton High School

 
1906 establishments in New Jersey
Borough form of New Jersey government
Boroughs in Atlantic County, New Jersey
Populated places established in 1906